USS Poinsett was a gunboat acquired by the U.S. Navy from the U.S. War Department for use during the Second Seminole War. Post-war she performed survey duties before being returned to the War Department.

Service history
The first ship to be so named by the Navy, Poinsett, a sidewheel gunboat, was transferred from the War Department to the Navy Department in 1840 for service in the 2nd Seminole War. Initially commanded by Comdr. Isaac Mayo, she was employed against the Seminoles until August 1842 when a large percentage of the tribe was relocated in the west. Then assigned to survey activities, Poinsett remained in the waters off Florida, primarily in the Tampa area, until returned to the War Department in 1845

References
 

Gunboats of the United States Navy
Seminole War ships of the United States
Survey ships of the United States Navy